Carl "Karl" Fister (born August 11, 1935) is a former Austrian-American soccer center forward who earned two caps, scoring one goal, with the U.S. national team in 1960.  Fister's two caps both came in matches against Mexico in qualification for the 1962 FIFA World Cup.  Fister scored in the first of the two games, a 3–3 tie.  However, the U.S. lost seven days later putting them out of contention for the finals.

Fister played his club ball in the German American Soccer League and was a member of the German-American League Junior All Stars tour of West Germany in July and August 1960.  At the time, he played for New York Hungaria.

References

External links
 
 
 

1935 births
Living people
American soccer players
United States men's international soccer players
German-American Soccer League players
New York Hungaria players
Association football forwards